National Unity and Armed Forces Day is an Italian national day since 1919 which commemorates the victory in World War I, a war event considered the completion of the process of unification of Italy. It is celebrated every 4 November, which is the anniversary of the armistice of Villa Giusti becoming effective in 1918 declaring Austria-Hungary's surrender.

History 

Italy entered the First World War in 1915 with the aim of completing national unity: for this reason, the Italian intervention in the First World War is also considered the Fourth Italian War of Independence, in a historiographical perspective that identifies in the latter the conclusion of the unification of Italy, whose military actions began during the revolutions of 1848 with the First Italian War of Independence.

The Treaty of Saint-Germain-en-Laye (1919) and the Treaty of Rapallo (1920) allowed the annexation of Trentino Alto-Adige, Julian March, Istria, Kvarner as well as the Dalmatian city of Zara; the subsequent Treaty of Rome (1924) led to the annexation of the city of Fiume to Italy. 

Established in 1919, 4 November is the only Italian national holiday which has gone through decades of Italian history: from the liberal period to fascist and  republican Italy. In 1921, during the National Unity and Armed Forces Day, the Italian Unknown Soldier (Milite Ignoto) was solemnly buried at the Altare della Patria in Rome. 

In 1922, shortly after the march on Rome, the holiday changed its name to Anniversario della Vittoria (Victory Anniversary) to emphasize Italian military power, while after the end of World War II, in 1949, the original meaning was restored, becoming the celebration of Italian armed forces and the achievement of  Italian Unity.
 
With the birth of the Italian Republic in 1946, the national anthem was changed: the Marcia Reale was replaced by Il Canto degli Italiani, which was officially played for the first time as the Italian national anthem on the occasion of the National Unity and Armed Forces Day on 4 November 1946.

4 November was a holiday until 1976. From 1977, during the austerity caused by the 1973 oil crisis, it became a moveable feast according to the calendar reform of national holidays introduced by law n. 54 of 5 March 1977,  and celebrations occurred every first Sunday of November.

During the 1980s and 1990s, its importance declined but in the 2000s, thanks to the impulse given by former president of the republic Carlo Azeglio Ciampi, who has been a main protagonist of a general valorization of Italian national symbols, the holiday gained more widespread celebrations.

Celebration 

On 4 November, and the days shortly before, the President of Italy and other important officers of the State pay homage to the Italian Unknown Soldier (Milite Ignoto), buried in the Altare della Patria in Rome, visit the Redipuglia War Memorial, where there are the bodies of 100,000 Italian soldiers who died in the First World War, as well as Vittorio Veneto, where there occurred the last and decisive battle between the Royal Italian Army and the Austro-Hungarian Army.

The Italian President and Minister of Defence send to the Italian Armed Forces a greeting and gratitude message  in the name of the whole country. 4 November is celebrated also in other institutional offices like Regions, Provinces and Comuni.

During the national holiday, there is the change of guards, at the Quirinal Palace, with Corazzieri and the fanfare of 4th Carabinieri Cavalry Regiment in high uniform. This rite occurs only in other two occasions, during celebrations of Tricolour Day (7 January) and Republic Day (2 June).

The Italian Army Forces usually open the barracks to the public and allow visits to the naval military units. Arms showings and exhibitions about WWI are often held inside barracks. There are often sport demonstrations and exercise carried by soldiers.

In squares of the main Italian cities, concerts are held by military bands, as well as other celebrations in front of the Monument to the fallen situated in each Commune.

Controversies 
During the protests of 1968, Armed forces Day became an object of protest and dissent by different political groups.

Especially in the second half of the 1960s and the first of the 1970s, on 4 November the radical movement, far-left groups and "dissident catholics" began protests to ask for recognition of a  right to conscientious objection. They also criticised the overall military institutions.

Sometimes protests were carried on by the distribution of leaflets and posting of posters against armed forces. Protesters were often pursued for offences to the Army's honour and prestige and for inciting soldiers to insubordination.

See also 

 Armistice of Villa Giusti
 Bollettino della Vittoria
 Bollettino della Vittoria Navale
 Italian Armed Forces
 Italian Front (WWI)
 World War I
 Public holidays in Italy
 Anniversary of the Unification of Italy
 Anniversary of the Liberation
 Festa della Repubblica
 National Memorial Day of the Exiles and Foibe
 Tricolour Day

Notes

References

External links 

 7
Legge 5 marzo 1977, n. 54

Public holidays in Italy